The 2021–22 Elite One Championship will be the 87th season of France's domestic rugby league competition and the 21st season known as the Elite One championship. There will be nine teams in the league. Each team will play 16 matches in the regular season. The top six teams will progress to a three-week final series played throughout May 2022.

AS Carcassonne won their second Elite One Championship and twelfth French Rugby League Championship after beating league leaders Limoux Grizzlies in the final 20-16 after finishing 2nd in the regular season.

Teams

Regular season 
The regular season started on 17 October 2021 and ended on 24 April 2022. Each team was scheduled with every other team twice, once at home and the other away making 16 games for each team and a total of 72 games.

Results 

Source:

Ladder 

 3 points for a victory
 1 point bonus for losing team if the margin is less than 12
 If two teams have equal points then the separation factor is point difference. If a team has a greater point difference they rank higher on the table. If still tied then head-to-head matches will be the tie-breaker.

Finals Series 
At the end of the regular season, the top six from the regular season advance to the knockout stage. First and second receive a bye for the first week of finals as third plays sixth (Qualifying Final 1) and fourth plays fifth (Qualifying Final 2), with the losers of both matches eliminated. First then plays the winner of Qualifying final 1 and second then plays the winner of Qualifying Final 2. The winners of these two matches play in Grand Final on 22 May at  Parc des Sports et de l'Amitié in Narbonne.

Bracket

Grand Final

References 

Rugby league competitions in France
2021 in French rugby league
2022 in French rugby league